The principle of nonvacuous contrast is a logical or methodological principle which requires that a genuine predicate never refer to everything, or to nothing, within its universe of discourse.

References 

Logic
Principles